The 1950 Singapore Municipal Commission election took place on 2 December 1950 to elect 6 of the 27 seats in the Singapore Municipal Commission.

Results

By constituency

References 

Singapore City Council elections
Municipal Commission election
Singapore
Singapore Municipal Commission election